Gotthold is a name of German origin. People with the name include:

People with the given name
Gotthold Eisenstein (1823–1852), German mathematician
Gotthold Gloger (1924–2001), German writer and painter 
Samuel Gotthold Lange (1711-1781), German poet
Gotthold Ephraim Lessing (1729—1781), German writer, philosopher, dramatist, publicist, and art critic 
Gotthold Salomon (1784-1862), German rabbi, politician and Bible translator.
Gotthold Schwarz (born 1952), German bass-baritone singer and conductor

People with the surname
Helene Gotthold (1896–1944), a Jehovah's Witness executed by the Nazis

See also
Grube Gotthold, a former mine in eastern Germany
 Gottfried
 Gotthelf, Gotthilf
 Gottheil
 Gottlieb
 Gottschalk, Gottschall
 Gottwald